The American Cigar Company Building in the Chambersburg neighborhood of Trenton, New Jersey was established in 1903 by Albert Gold.  In 1931 it employed 840 workers.  It was added to the National Register of Historic Places in 2011 and has been converted into residential lofts.

See also
National Register of Historic Places listings in Mercer County, New Jersey

References

Industrial buildings and structures on the National Register of Historic Places in New Jersey
Industrial buildings completed in 1903
Buildings and structures in Trenton, New Jersey
National Register of Historic Places in Trenton, New Jersey
Historic cigar factories
Tobacco buildings in the United States
New Jersey Register of Historic Places